This is a list of architects from Quebec, Canada.

 Ray Affleck
 John Smith Archibald
 Charles Baillairgé
 François Baillairgé
 Jean Baillairgé
 Thomas Baillairgé
 Claude Baillif
 Béïque Legault Thuot, architecture firm
 François-Xavier Berlinguet
 Henry Musgrave Blaiklock
 George Browne
 Napoléon Bourassa
 Louis Bourgeois
 Aurèle Cardinal
 Melvin Charney
 Claude Cormier
 Ernest Cormier
 Marie-Chantal Croft
 Roger D'Astous
 Jean Dumontier
 Alexander Francis Dunlop
 Harold Lea Fetherstonhaugh
 Robert Findlay
 Karl Fischer
 Michael Fish
 Dan Hanganu
 Julien Hébert
 Maxwell M. Kalman
 Phyllis Lambert
 Ludger Lemieux
 Robert Henry MacDonald
 Janet Leys Shaw Mactavish
 Edward Maxwell
 William Sutherland Maxwell
 Harry Mayerovitch
 John Campbell Merrett
 Georges-Alphonse Monette
 Percy Erskine Nobbs
 James O'Donnell
 John Ostell
 Christian Ouellet
 Maurice Perrault
 Peter Rose
 George Allen Ross
 Ross and Macdonald, architecture firm
 Hazen Sise
 Eugène-Étienne Taché
 Andrew Taylor
 William Thomas
 William Tutin Thomas, son of William Thomas
 Joseph Venne
 John Wells

See also
Architecture of Quebec
Architecture of Montreal
Architecture of Quebec City

References

External links
Quebec Religious Heritage Foundation

Architects
Architects
Quebec
Architects
Quebec